The DVD is a Napalm Death DVD released by Earache in 2001. The only material seeing release for the first time is the Nottingham show from 1989 and the ULU show from 1989. The version of Utopia Banished currently in print features The DVD as a bonus disc.

Live at Salisbury Arts Centre - 30 June 1990 (Live Corruption)

Note: the setlist is scrambled for the video version of Live Corruption. The actual setlist is on the CD version.

Live at Nottingham Rock City - 14 November 1989

Live at University of London Union - 23 February 1989 (BBC TV 'Arena' Heavy Metal Special)

Promo Clips
Suffer the Children
Mass Appeal Madness
The World Keeps Turning
Plague Rages
Greed Killing
Breed to Breathe (uncensored)

Credits
Salisbury Arts Centre - 30 June 1990
Mark "Barney" Greenway - vocals
Jesse Pintado - lead guitar
Mitch Harris - rhythm guitar
Shane Embury - bass
Mick Harris - drums

Nottingham Rock City - 14 November 1989
Mark "Barney" Greenway - vocals
Jesse Pintado - guitars
Shane Embury - bass
Mick Harris - drums

London Killburn National - 1989
Lee Dorrian - vocals
Bill Steer - guitars
Shane Embury - bass
Mick Harris - drums

2001 video albums
Napalm Death live albums
Napalm Death video albums
Live video albums
2001 live albums